GO Transit bus services are provided throughout the Greater Toronto and Hamilton Area (GTHA) and the Greater Golden Horseshoe.

While GO Transit started as a single train line in 1967, 15 buses were introduced on September 8, 1970, extending service beyond the original Lakeshore line to Hamilton and Oshawa, as well as providing service north to Newmarket and Barrie. In 1989, GO started running buses between outer train stations and Union at off-peak times when trains were not scheduled. The bus network started expanding beyond train lines, feeding rail service and serving communities beyond the reach of existing trains. In 2000, GO Transit went beyond its existing train corridors and began service along Highway 407, linking York University to Oshawa, Mississauga and Oakville.

The GO Transit bus fleet consists of 366 single-level coach buses and 139 double-decker buses. Two of the coach buses are diesel-electric hybrid vehicles. GO Transit began acquiring double-decker buses in 2007 to relieve crowding on some routes. The first generation stood at a height of 4.3 metres, and second and third generations were built and acquired at even lower heights – in 2013 and 2016 at 4.15 and 3.9 metres, respectively – that allowed them to pass under lower bridges and trees and be used on additional routes. All of the buses are equipped with bike racks.

GO buses serve 15 bus terminals, as well as several local stops which include carpool/park and ride lots established by the Ministry of Transportation along Ontario highways. On average, 2,458 weekday and 1,218 weekend bus trips are made, with 70% of all bus travellers going to or from Toronto. All GO Transit fares are calculated by the fare zones that the origin and destination of the trip are in, as well as by passenger category (adult, student, senior or child). GO bus fares are not differentiated based whether or not trains are used for part of the trip.

Routes

Lakeshore West corridor

Milton corridor

Kitchener corridor

Highway 407 corridor

Richmond Hill corridor

Barrie corridor

Stouffville corridor

Lakeshore East corridor

Terminals, stations and carpool/park and ride lots

Maintenance facilities
GO buses are maintained at 5 facilities:
 Brampton Garage (85 Van Kirk Drive)
 Halton Hills Garage (19 Mansewood Court, Acton)
 Oshawa Garage (1002 Thornton Road South - Boundary Road and Wentworth Street)
 Steeprock (North York)
 Streetsville

Notes

External links
 GO Transit Full Schedules

GO Transit
GO Transit